Hesse is a rural locality in the Golden Plains Shire, Victoria, Australia. In the 2016 census, Hesse had a population of 19 people.

Hesse covers an area of rural farmland along the Hamilton Highway between the towns of Cressy and Inverleigh. The Western standard gauge line runs through the locality; while Hesse never had a station, the former station at Wingeel was close to the Hesse boundary. Wentworths Road, which runs north/north-west in the direction of Shelford, is the only other significant road in the locality. The Warrambine and Mia Mia Creeks also run through Hesse.

Warrambine Post Office opened on 16 January 1871, was renamed Hesse Post Office on 14 February 1871, and closed on 1 July 1899. A postal receiving office opened at Hesse in 1903, and a second Hesse Post Office was opened on 17 February 1914; it became a receiving office again on 1 August 1914, a post office again on 1 July 1927, and closed on 31 January 1966.

The Barunah Plains Homestead is located at Hesse.

References

Towns in Victoria (Australia)
Golden Plains Shire